Cross Country is an American harmony trio from Brooklyn, New York, United States. The folk rock band was formed as a side project of The Tokens, and featured three of its members: Jay Siegel, Mitch Margo and Phil Margo.

The group released one self-titled album on the Atco Records label, featuring a top 40 cover of Wilson Pickett's "In the Midnight Hour".  The Cross Country version is altogether different from Pickett's 1965 soul hit.  The first two minutes of the Cross Country single is considerably slower with an acoustic backdrop, picking up a bit with some psychedelic touches in the last third of the track, which was a little over three minutes in length (3:14).  This single reached No. 30 in the U.S. Billboard Hot 100 in late 1973.

The trio disbanded in 1974, with the members moving on to either record production and/or song writing duties.

Track listing
 "Today" - 2:47
 "Just a Thought" - 3:18
 "Cross Country" - 3:49
 "In the Midnight Hour" - 3:14
 "Thing With Wings" - 2:00
 "Extended Wings" - 2:35
 "Tastes So Good to Me" - 3:10
 "A Fall Song" - 2:49
 "Choirboy" - 3:20
 "A Ball Song" - 2:50
 "A Smile Song" - 4:28

References

External links
The Tokens official website

American pop rock music groups